Panther Creek is a stream in Gentry and Harrison counties of northern Missouri. It is a tributary of the East Fork Grand River.

According to tradition, Panther Creek was so named on account of some pioneers encountering panthers along its course.

See also
List of rivers of Missouri

References

Rivers of Gentry County, Missouri
Rivers of Harrison County, Missouri
Rivers of Missouri